12 Super Exitos is a compilation of Selena's greatest hits released in 1994 by EMI Latin. It was the last album released before her murder on March 31, 1995. After its release, Selena began working on her crossover album which was set to be released in the summer of 1995.

Track listing
"Si Una Vez"
"La Llamada"
"No debes Jugar"
"Las Cadenas"
"Techno Cumbia"
"Tú Robaste Mi Corazón" (with Emilio Navaira)
"Bidi Bidi Bom Bom"
"No Quiero Saber"
"La Carcacha"
"Missing My Baby"
"Como La Flor"
"Qué Creías"

Charts

Weekly charts

Certifications

References

1994 greatest hits albums
Selena compilation albums
Spanish-language compilation albums
EMI Records compilation albums
Albums produced by A.B. Quintanilla
Albums recorded at Q-Productions